Hopewell is a settlement in Saint Ann Parish, Jamaica.

References

Populated places in Saint Ann Parish